SM UB-12 was a German Type UB I submarine or U-boat in the German Imperial Navy during World War I. The submarine disappeared in August 1918.

UB-12 was ordered in October 1914 and was laid down at the AG Weser shipyard in Bremen in November. She carried two torpedoes for her two bow torpedo tubes and was also armed with a deck-mounted machine gun. UB-12 was broken into sections and shipped by rail to Antwerp for reassembly. She was launched and commissioned as SM UB-12 in March 1915.

UB-12 spent her entire career in the Flanders Flotilla and sank 22 ships, about half of them British fishing vessels. The U-boat was also responsible for sinking the British destroyer  in 1917. By early 1917, UB-12 had been converted into a minelayer with the replacement of her torpedo tubes with four mine chutes. UB-12 disappeared after 19 August 1918.

Design and construction 
After the German Army's rapid advance along the North Sea coast in the earliest stages of World War I, the German Imperial Navy found itself without suitable submarines that could be operated in the narrow and shallow seas off Flanders. Project 34, a design effort begun in mid-August 1914, produced the Type UB I design: a small submarine that could be shipped by rail to a port of operations and quickly assembled.

UB-12 was part of the initial allotment of seven submarines—numbered  to —ordered on 15 October from AG Weser of Bremen, just shy of two months after planning for the class began. UB-12 was laid down by Weser in Bremen on 7 November. She had a single  Körting 4-cylinder diesel engine for surface travel, and a single  Siemens-Schuckert electric motor for underwater travel, both attached to a single propeller shaft.

UB-12 was armed with two  torpedoes in two bow torpedo tubes. She was also outfitted for a single  machine gun on deck. UB-12s standard complement consisted of one officer and thirteen enlisted men.

After work on UB-12 was complete at the Weser yard, she was readied for rail shipment. The process of shipping a UB I boat involved breaking the submarine down into what was essentially a knock down kit. Each boat was broken into approximately fifteen pieces and loaded onto eight railway flatcars. In February 1915, the sections of UB-12 were shipped to Antwerp for assembly in what was typically a two- to three-week process. After UB-12 was assembled and launched on 2 March, she was loaded on a barge and taken through canals to Bruges where she underwent trials.

Early career 
The submarine was commissioned into the German Imperial Navy as SM UB-12 on 29 March 1915 under the command of Kapitänleutnant (Kapt.) Hans Nieland, a 29-year-old first-time U-boat commander. On 18 April, UB-12 joined the Flanders Flotilla, which had been organized on 29 March. When UB-12 joined the flotilla, Germany was in the midst of its first submarine offensive, begun in February. During this campaign, enemy vessels in the German-defined war zone, which encompassed all waters around the United Kingdom, were to be sunk. Vessels of neutral countries were not to be attacked unless they definitively could be identified as enemy vessels operating under a false flag.

All four of the sunken ships were smacks—sailing vessels traditionally rigged with red ochre sails—which were stopped, boarded by crewmen from UB-12, and sunk with explosives. UB-12 similarly sank a pair of smacks off Lowestoft on 4 August, and another trio from 23 to 25 August.

On 21 November, Nieland was succeeded by Oberleutnant zur See (Oblt.) Wilhelm Kiel in command of UB-12. Under Kiel's command, UB-12 sank three ships on 21 February 1916: the 92 GRT Belgian fishing ship La Petite Henriette, the largest sunk to-date by UB-12, and another pair of British smacks, Oleander and W.E. Brown.

The British-registered ship was en route from Hull to Philadelphia in ballast when Kiel torpedoed her without warning a little more than one nautical mile (two kilometers) from the Corton Lightvessel. Other ships picked up 31 survivors from Silksworth Hall, but 3 men were lost. Later in the month, Admiral Reinhardt Scheer, the newest commander-in-chief of the High Seas Fleet, called off the merchant shipping offensive and ordered all boats at sea to return, and all boats in port to remain there.

Grand Fleet ambush attempts 
In mid-May, Scheer completed plans to draw out part of the British Grand Fleet. The German High Seas Fleet would sortie for a raid on Sunderland, luring the British fleet across nests' of submarines and mine-fields". This group was to intercept and attack the British light forces from Harwich, should they sortie north to join the battle. Unfortunately for the Germans, the British Admiralty had intelligence reports of the departure of the submarines which, coupled with an absence of attacks on shipping, aroused British suspicions.

A delayed departure of the German High Seas Fleet for its sortie (which had been redirected to the Skagerrak) and the failure of several of the U-boats stationed to the north to receive the coded message warning of the British advance caused Scheer's anticipated ambush to be a "complete and disappointing failure". In UB-12s group, only UB-10 sighted the Harwich forces, and they were too far away to mount an attack. The failure of the submarine ambush to sink any British capital ships allowed the full Grand Fleet to engage the numerically inferior High Seas Fleet in the Battle of Jutland, which took place 31 May – 1 June.

Kapitänleutnant Georg Gerth took command of UB-12 on 26 June, after Oblt. Kiel was assigned to command the new minelaying submarine . Two months later, Admiral Scheer set up another ambush for the British fleet with plans for another High Seas Fleet raid on Sunderland (as had been the original intention in May). The German fleet planned to depart late in the day on 18 August and shell military targets the next morning. As in May, UB-12 was part of a group intended to attack the Harwich forces. As one of five boats forming the second line of boats from the Flanders Flotilla, UB-12 was stationed off Texel by the morning of 20 August. Once again, British intelligence had given warning of the impending attack and ambush, causing the Grand Fleet to sortie at 16:00 on 18 August, five hours before the German fleet sailed. Faulty intelligence caused Scheer initially to divert from Sunderland, and then to eventually call off the whole operation. Although U-boats to the north sank two British light cruisers, UB-12 and her group played no part in the action.

In September, Gerth led UB-12 in sinking two more ships and capturing a third ship as a prize. The 313 GRT Norwegian steamer Rilda was sunk on 6 September, while the 55 GRT Marjorie was sunk on the 28th. In between the Dutch ship Niobe was seized as a prize on the 7th.

Conversion to minelayer 
UB-12 and three sister boats—UB-10, UB-16, and UB-17—were all converted to minelaying submarines. UB-12 was at the dockyard from November 1916 to January 1917, and it is likely the boat was converted during this timeframe. The conversion involved removing the bow section containing the pair of torpedo tubes from each U-boat and replacing it with a new bow containing four mine chutes capable of carrying two mines each.

During this same time, Kapt. Friedrich Moecke in early November. Moecke was, in turn, replaced by Oblt. Ernst Steindorff in January 1917.

By March, the newly converted submarine had begun laying mines off the French coast. The French Navy trawler Elisabeth struck one of UB-12s mines off Calais on 13 March and sank. Five days later, the British auxiliary minesweeper HMS Duchess of Montrose sank with a loss of 12 men after detonating a mine laid by UB-12 off Gravelines.
On 23 March, a destroyer with the Dover Patrol, struck one of UB-12s mines off Cape Gris-Nez and went down with the loss of 59 men.

On the night of 14/15 May while UB-12 was on the surface, Steindorff noted a large underwater explosion some miles away in a British minefield, and when UB-39 failed to return to Zeebrugge, one of the bases for the Flanders Flotilla, reported what was likely the demise of UB-39 at the hands of a British mine.

April found two more victims added to UB-12s tally. On the 20th, Nepaulin, another British auxiliary minesweeper was lost on one of UB-12s mines near the Dyck Lightvessel. Six days later, the British steamer Alhama was mined while loaded with pit props destined for Dunkirk. The 1,744 GRT cargo ship was the largest ship sunk by UB-12 since the Silksworth Hall, sunk the previous April. UB-12 sank another two ships under Steindorff's command, one each in June and July. The steamer Dulwich—carrying coal from Seaham for London—was mined and sunk with the loss of five men on 10 June. One month later, the French patrol vessel Jupiter I was mined off Calais. These were the last two ships credited to mines from UB-12 for the next fourteen months.

Fate 

UB-12s activities over the next year are not well documented, and no specific record of her can be found in English-language sources. However, it is known that during this period, she was helmed by four different commanders, with the final officer, Oblt. Ernst Schöller, assuming command in May 1918. Under Schöller's command, UB-12 departed Zeebrugge on 19 August to lay mines in the Downs off the Kentish coast, but never returned. According to one British source, UB-12 was herself mined off Helgoland sometime in August. Author Dwight Messimer considers this unlikely given that Helgoland is nowhere near the route that UB-12 could have taken to get to the Downs. A postwar German study concluded the two most likely fates for UB-12 were that she either struck a British mine or was destroyed by one of her own mines that malfunctioned during deployment. Messimer also considers it possible that UB-12 may have had a diving accident related to her conversion to a minelayer.

Some two months after UB-12s presumed loss, she was credited with the sinking of her final ship. On 27 October, two weeks before the end of the war, the 92 GRT British ship Calceolaria struck one of UB-12s mines near the Elbow Lightvessel and sank.

Summary of raiding history

Notes

References

Bibliography

External links 
 'UB-12 off Ramsgate: Marine Geophysical Survey and Archaeological Report'
 'Historic England project to research First World War submarines' 

German Type UB I submarines
Ships built in Bremen (state)
Ships built in Belgium
1915 ships
U-boats commissioned in 1915
World War I submarines of Germany
Maritime incidents in 1918
U-boats sunk in 1918
World War I shipwrecks in the Atlantic Ocean
Ships lost with all hands
Missing U-boats of World War I